Daniel Mwangi (born 20 November 1965) is a Kenyan boxer. He competed in the men's light flyweight event at the 1984 Summer Olympics.

References

External links
 

1965 births
Living people
Kenyan male boxers
Olympic boxers of Kenya
Boxers at the 1984 Summer Olympics
Place of birth missing (living people)
Light-flyweight boxers